Gerald George McNeil (April 17, 1926 – June 17, 2004) was a professional ice hockey goaltender who won three Stanley Cups with the Montreal Canadiens between 1947 and 1956. With the Canadiens he won the Stanley Cup in 1953.

Career
McNeil first signed with the Canadiens in 1943 when he was only 17. While playing with their farm team, the Montreal Royals of the Quebec Senior Hockey League (QSHL), he served as a practice goalie with the Habs whenever they were in Montreal. McNeil won the Byng of Vimy award for the most valuable player three times in the QSHL, and the Royals won the Allan Cup in 1947.
  
McNeil was called up from the Cincinnati Mohawks of the American Hockey League (AHL) in March 1950 when Montreal's goaltender, Bill Durnan, was hit in the head with a skate blade. Teams in this era usually carried a single goalie who played every minute, barring injury. McNeil recorded a 1.50 goals against average (GAA) over six games and preserved Durnan's sixth and final Vezina Trophy, then awarded to the goalie who played the most, of the team with the fewest goals against. This rookie performance earned McNeil "the Schaefer player of the week" award. Durnan returned but felt he had lost his edge, so he announced that he sit out a playoff game against the New York Rangers. McNeil initially refused to take "Bill's spot," so Durnan was asked to talk to his understudy in a private part of the dressing room. Both men shed tears, as the "torch" was passed down, and McNeil then succeeded Durnan as Montreal's goalie.
 
McNeil played every game for the Canadiens from March 1950 to November 1952, a streak that included two entire 70-game seasons, 1950–51 and 1951–52. In the 1951 Stanley Cup playoffs, McNeil went 214 minutes of shutout hockey against the powerful Detroit Red Wings, a stretch that included two marathon overtime games at the Detroit Olympia. McNeil made 38 of his 62 game one saves in extra time, a performance that prompted Jack Adams, Detroit's general manager, to remark, "It was like running into one-hit pitching your first time out. The greatest goalkeeping this team ever faced." The Canadiens won both games on goals by Maurice Richard and a stellar performance by McNeil, who was dubbed by the Detroit press, "the magician." When the Canadiens went on to eliminate the heavily-favored Red Wings, Detroit's coach, Tommy Ivan, remarked, "Gerry McNeil was the difference. He was terrific in their net." The 1951 Stanley Cup Finals remain the only best-of-seven series in which every game required overtime. Bill Barilko's Cup-winning goal for the Toronto Maple Leafs against McNeil was famously captured in a photograph by Nat Turofsky, remaining part of the legend surrounding Barilko's death.

McNeil recorded 10 shutouts in the 1952–53 season, making his play essential as the Canadiens only scored 155 goals in 70 games, a 2.21 goals per game rate. The last game of the regular season was against Detroit at the Olympia, and sitting at 49 goals, Gordie Howe was set to match and perhaps beat Richard's then-record of 50 in a season, set when he had scored 50 goals in 50 games in 1943-44. Howe did not score on five shots against McNeil, who was heard telling Richard after the game, "well Rock, he'll have to start over at one again." McNeil's Stanley Cup victory a few weeks later was immortalized in Wayne Johnston's novel, The Divine Ryans. He won the Cup the night before his 27th birthday with a shutout in overtime.

In the 1954 Stanley Cup Finals McNeil suffered another overtime loss, this time in game seven, when the puck was deflected past him by his teammate Doug Harvey. He retired that summer but returned to professional hockey a year later with the Montreal Royals. He then filled in for an asthmatic Jacques Plante at the beginning of the 1956-57 NHL season, before playing the rest of the season with the Royals. His named was engraved on the Stanley Cup for the 1957 Finals, and for the 1958 Finals because he was the team's playoff spare goalie. After then played two seasons with the Rochester Americans in the AHL before finishing his professional career in his hometown with the Quebec Aces.

McNeil led the Montreal Canadiens to the Stanley Cup Finals all four seasons from 1950 to 1954, the seasons in which he was their number one goalie. This stretch was the first four of ten consecutive appearances in the Cup Finals for the Habs.

McNeil was known to play his best when it mattered most. He finished his NHL career with a 2.32 GAA for the regular season and a 1.89 in the playoffs. He appeared in three NHL All-Star games, (1951, 1952 and 1953) and posted a 2.00 GAA.  His 28 regular season shutouts earned him an NHL Milestone Award in 1982.

Personal life
Born to Peter McNeil and Rose Dyotte (dit Gyotte) in 1926, McNeil was married to Theresa Conway (1927–2009) for 58 years, and the couple had four children, Shannon, Karen, David, and Donna, and six grandchildren. After retiring from hockey, McNeil worked as a sales representative for a number of organizations. His last position was regional sales manager for Thomas Adams, a Seagram's company. He spent a number of winters in Panama City Beach, Florida with his hockey buddies: Elmer Lach, Ken Mosdell and Maurice Richard. He joined the first two as pallbearers at Richard's funeral in May 2000 and died of cancer in 2004.

Career statistics

Regular season and playoffs

References

 Charles Halpin, "Royals McNeil Unanimous Choice on Third Gazette All-Star Squad," The Gazette 12 Mar. 1949: 21.
 The Goaltender Homepage, <http://www.hockeygoalies.org/bio/mcneil.html>  Accessed 27 Feb. 2012
 "Our History: The Historical Website of the Montreal Canadiens." <http://ourhistory.canadiens.com/player/Gerry-McNeil>.  Accessed 27 Feb. 2012
 "Hockey DB.com." <http://www.hockeydb.com/ihdb/stats/pdisplay.php?pid=3627.>  Accessed 27 Feb. 2012
 "National League," The Hockey News 18 Mar. 1950: 9.
 D’Arcy Jenish, The Montreal Canadiens: 100 Years of Glory (Toronto: Doubleday, 2008), 126–27.
 Brian Kendall, Shutout: The Legend of Terry Sawchuk (Toronto: Penguin Books, 1996), 42.
 Paul Chandler, "League’s Ignored Goalie is Magician," The Detroit News 28 Mar. 1951: 57.
 Dink Carroll, "Playing the Field," The Gazette 9 Apr. 1951: 22.
 Dick Irvin, The Habs: An Oral History of the Montreal Canadiens, 1940-80 (Toronto: McClelland & Stewart, 1992), 94.
 Wayne Johnston, The Divine Ryans (Toronto: Vintage, 1990), 152–56.
 Mike Wyman, "A Master Prankster: McNeil Legend Lives On," The Hockey News, Collector’s Edition Fall, 2005: 153.
 David Naylor, "NHL Goalie Made Hockey History" The Globe and Mail 26 July 2004: R5.
 David McNeil, In the Pressure of the Moment: Remembering Gerry McNeil Midtown Press (2016) .

External links
 

1926 births
2004 deaths
Anglophone Quebec people
Canadian expatriate ice hockey players in the United States
Canadian ice hockey goaltenders
Cincinnati Mohawks (AHL) players
Ice hockey people from Quebec City
Montreal Canadiens players
Montreal Royals (EPHL) players
Montreal Royals (QSHL) players
Quebec Aces (AHL) players
Rochester Americans players
Stanley Cup champions